The 1995 NASCAR SuperTruck Series presented by Craftsman was the inaugural season of the NASCAR SuperTruck Series. The season began on February 5, 1995, and ended on October 28. Mike Skinner of Richard Childress Racing won the championship.

Prior to and after the season, NASCAR conducted seven exhibition races.

This was the first year that Dodge ran in NASCAR in any capacity since 1985.

Teams and drivers

Schedule
The 1995 SuperTruck Series presented by Craftsman schedule consisted of twenty races, at eighteen tracks in fifteen states. In addition, an exhibition race was run following the end of the season at the Homestead-Miami Speedway as a demonstration of the trucks' suitability for larger racetracks.

Season summary
The Skoal Bandit Copper World Classic, the first SuperTruck race to be run, was an 80-lap race held February 5 at Phoenix International Raceway. The second race of the year at Tucson Raceway Park was the first Truck race to have a green–white–checker finish. Mike Skinner led the Maxx Race Cards 200 at Portland Speedway from flag to flag (all 200 laps), while the No. 58 of Wayne Jacks rolled over after hitting a large tractor tire that separated pit road from the race track. In the Total Petroleum 200 at Colorado National Speedway, the  margin of victory by Butch Miller over Mike Skinner was officially .001 of a second.  Replays during the telecast on CBS showed a virtual dead heat between Miller and Skinner at the checkered flag. In the following race at Heartland Park Topeka, the No. 51 of Kerry Teague was injured in a crash on lap 9 after the throttle hung on his Chevrolet. His truck then spun driver's side first into the wall, making the truck slightly airborne. Teague was airlifted to a local hospital for precautionary reasons. At Indianapolis Raceway Park in the Action Packed Racing Cards 150, on the last lap of the race, the No. 77 of Gary St. Amant (who finished 11th) spun out off of turn 2 and hit a light pole in the infield, knocking out a cluster of lights in the process.  The same exact lights were knocked out the next evening during the Busch Grand National race by Chris Diamond; Mike Skinner lead flag to flag again (all 150 laps). The Stevens Beil/Genuine Car Parts 150 at Flemington Speedway saw the race was lengthened to 151 laps due to a green–white–checker finish; the race was Jack Sprague's debut for Hendrick Motorsports.

The Lowe's 150 at North Wilkesboro Speedway on September 30 saw the Truck debut of Ernie Irvan, who had been out of racing for over a year because of critical injuries suffered in practice for the 1994 GM Goodwrench 400 at Michigan International Speedway.  Irvan qualified his No. 28 on the outside pole and led 24 laps.  However, his truck was unable to answer the call after the halftime break and was credited with a 30th-place finish.  The next day, Irvan made his comeback to the Winston Cup Series in a second Texaco/Havoline Ford for Robert Yates Racing, the No. 88. In the following race at Sears Point Raceway, Ray Daniels in the No. 34 truck flipped out of the course coming to rest on the tire wall after hitting the tires coming out of Turn 10. Daniels was uninjured. Ron Hornaday Jr. led all 40 laps en route to the win.

Results and standings

Races

Driver standings

See also 
1995 NASCAR Winston Cup Series
1995 NASCAR Busch Series
1994–95 NASCAR SuperTruck Series exhibition races

References

External links 

 Craftsman Truck Series standings and statistics for 1995 - Racing-Reference.info

NASCAR Truck Series seasons